François Dogaer (6 July 1897 – 1970) was a Belgian footballer. He played in three matches for the Belgium national football team in 1921.

References

External links
 

1897 births
1970 deaths
Belgian footballers
Belgium international footballers
Place of birth missing
Association football forwards
K.R.C. Mechelen players